The Hindu Temple and Cultural Center of Birmingham is a Hindu Temple located in Pelham, Alabama. It serves the Hindu population of the Birmingham Metropolitan Area

History
Hindus did not start immigrating to the Birmingham area until after the Immigration and Nationality Act of 1965 was passed, allowing non-European immigrants to come to the United States. Most Hindus would practice their religion in the rooms of other people's homes. By 1990, the Hindu population had grown tremendously and with the creation of the Hindu Temple of Atlanta, many Hindus desired their own permanent location to worship. Dr. Santosh Khare, a doctor who immigrated in 1972 to practice medicine at Cooper Green Mercy Hospital, created the Hindu Temple and Cultural Center of Birmingham organization in 1993 and oversaw a fundraising campaign to raise over $1 million for the construction of the temple. In 1998, the temple was opened to the public after extensive construction and designing. It is estimated over 1,000 Hindu Families now call the Birmingham Area home, the majority of whom live in Hoover and Pelham.

References

Hindu Temples in Alabama
Buildings and structures in Shelby County, Alabama
Hinduism in the United States
Religious buildings and structures completed in 1998
Religious organizations established in 1993
1998 establishments in Alabama
Asian-American culture in Alabama
Indian-American culture in Alabama